Magic of Love , is a 1999 album by mainland Chinese pop singer Zhao Wei. Besides mainland China, the selling of the album was 5 Platinum record in Hong Kong and Taiwan.

Track listing

References

External links
Sina.com
inkui.com

1999 albums
Zhao Wei albums